Nemesis is the fourteenth studio album by power metal band Stratovarius, released on 22 February 2013 through Edel AG. It is the first Stratovarius album to feature new drummer Rolf Pilve, who replaced Jörg Michael in 2012. The album was first announced on the band's official website on 24 November 2012, with the track listing being revealed on 5 December 2012. Nemesis reached No. 3 on the Finnish albums chart. A preview of "Unbreakable", the album's first single, was made available on YouTube and was released on 25 January 2013.

Background and recording 
Former Sonata Arctica guitarist Jani Liimatainen, who released the collaborative acoustic album Blackoustic in 2012 with singer Timo Kotipelto, guest performs on Nemesis, having also co-written two songs in "If the Story Is Over" and "Out of the Fog".

The band considered hiring an orchestra to perform in the album, but they abandoned the idea in the end.

The name of the album came up when guitarist Matias was sitting on the airport of Madrid and suggested it to his bandmates. At that point, most of the lyrics were already done. The woman on the cover may be a savior, an avenger or the author of all the destruction, according to Jens.

Track listing

Chart performance
Finland #3, Czech Republic #12, Billboard Heatseekers #16, Japan #17, Switzerland #30, Spain #32, Germany #41, Sweden #44, France #56, Norway #56, Austria #62, Canada #126

Critical reception

LA Weekly named its cover as the most ridiculous metal album cover of 2013.

Personnel

Stratovarius
Timo Kotipelto – vocals
Matias Kupiainen – guitar, mixing, production
Jens Johansson – keyboard
Rolf Pilve – drums
Lauri Porra – bass

Guest musicians
Jani Liimatainen – acoustic guitar, background vocals
Joakin Jokela – whistling
background vocals by the "Shark Finns" – Susana Koski, Anna Maria Parkkinen, Anna-Maija Jalkenen, Alexa Leroux, Tipe Johnson, Hepa Waara, Ari Sievälä, James Lascelles, Dane Stefaniuk, Koop Arponen

Production
Mika Jussila – mastering
Perttu Vänskä – production assistance
Kalle Keski-Orvola – production assistance
Paavo Kurkela – production assistance
Gyula Havancsák – cover art
Sander Nebeling – layout and package coordination

References

Stratovarius albums
Edel Music albums
2013 albums